Andrew Miller Thompson (February 8, 1963 – May 13, 2020) was an American politician who was a Republican member of the Ohio House of Representatives for the 95th district, which includes Carroll, Harrison and Noble counties, and portions of Washington and Belmont counties. Prior to 2012 redistricting, he represented the 93rd district for one term.  He served three terms on Marietta City Council (2005–2011) and was a co-publisher of his family's magazine, Bird Watcher's Digest.

Early life
Thompson was born in Pella, Iowa on February 8, 1963. He moved to Marietta, Ohio in 1971 and graduated from Marietta High School in 1981. He graduated from Central College at Pella, Iowa in 1985, and spent four years working for the Competitive Enterprise Institute, a libertarian think tank. Thompson was a member of the National Rifle Association.

Political career

Ohio House of Representatives
Thompson was first elected to represent the 93rd district in the Ohio House in November 2010, defeating Democrat Linda Secrest with 53.8% of the vote. After redistricting, Thompson ran in the 95th district, and defeated Democrat Charlie Daniels with 52.83% of the vote.

Political positions
In March 2013, Thompson introduced a bill that would effectively kill Ohio's healthcare exchange under the Affordable Care Act by prohibiting any insurance company that participated in the exchange from doing business in Ohio.

Thompson was an activist against the Common Core State Standards Initiative, and introduced a bill, HB 237, that would pull Ohio out of the standards and prohibit using the core-aligned standardized tests.

Personal life
Thompson's wife, Jade, is a Spanish teacher at Marietta High School.  They had three children. He died on May 13, 2020, at the age of 57 following a heart attack.

Bibliography

References

External links
Andy Thompson for Ohio - Official campaign site

1963 births
2020 deaths
Ohio city council members
Republican Party members of the Ohio House of Representatives
21st-century American politicians
Central College (Iowa) alumni
American magazine publishers (people)
Businesspeople from Ohio
Politicians from Marietta, Ohio
People from Pella, Iowa